Mpohor District is one of the fourteen districts in Western Region, Ghana. Originally it was formerly part of the then-larger Mpohor/Wassa East District in 1988, which was created from the former Wassa-Fiase-Mpohor District Council, until the southwest part of the district was split off to create Mpohor District on 28 June 2012; thus the remaining part has been renamed as Wassa East District. The district assembly is located in the eastern part of Western Region and has Mpohor as its capital town.

References

Districts of the Western Region (Ghana)